The McGill University Health Centre (MUHC) is one of two major healthcare networks in the city of Montreal, Quebec. It is affiliated with McGill University and is one of the largest medical complex in Montreal. It is the largest hospital system in Canada by bed capacity. The majority of its funding comes from Quebec taxpayers through the Ministry of Health and Social Services. The centre provides inpatient and ambulatory care.

History
The centre announced that it would consolidate its services in a single facility in 2007; it was a long and troubled process. It was budgeted at around $700 million but cost around $1.3 billion; it was meant to take only three years but took much longer. The project was completed in 2015.  The facility replaced the existing facilities of the Royal Victoria Hospital (on April 26, 2015), the Montreal Children's Hospital (on May 24, 2015), and the Montreal Chest Institute (on June 14, 2015). It did not replace either the Montreal General Hospital or the Hôpital de Lachine. It added a cancer centre and a part of the building also houses the Research Institute of the MUHC, which contains a Biosafety level 3 laboratory.

The McGill University Health Centre is part of a $2.355 billion Redevelopment Project on three sites - the Glen, the Montreal General and Lachine hospitals.

Role 
The McGill University Health Centre (MUHC) is a bilingual academic health network, and one of the largest and most modern in North America.
 
As of 2021, the institution comprises
 1,389 physicians
 5,284 nurses and patient attendants
 113 pharmacists
 71 dentists
In addition to
 3,813 other professionals including technicians 
 2,862 researchers, investigators, and postdoctoral fellows
 323 hospital managers
 517 volunteers

Being affiliated with the McGill University Faculty of Medicine, the MUHC also comprises
 2,862 medical residents
 1,806 nursing students
 731 other medical students
 141 fellows in adult and paediatric medicine
 21 dental residents 
 11 residents in oral surgery 
 348 students in other healthcare fields

The mandate of the institution is to provide tertiary and quaternary care to the population of Montreal, Quebec and adjacent provinces. In fact the RUIS McGill [the area over which it is designated that the MUHC has responsibility to provide healthcare covers half of the geographical area of Quebec stretching from Montreal to Nunavik in the far north.

The MUHC is the largest combined adult and children's hospital in the province, providing all aspects of specialized and complex care to both populations amongst its sites with paediatric, adult and cancer services being combined at the Glen site.

As a principal teaching site of the Faculty of Medicine of McGill University a key component is medical education.  In addition the Research Institute of the MUHC is an international research powerhouse with a worldwide reputation in the field of biomedical sciences and health care. the MUHC RI has

 Ongoing research collaborations with 51 countries worldwide
 around 1,800 peer-reviewed scientific publications per year
 1,600 ongoing projects (including clinical trials and others)
 over 180,000 research participants per year

Hospitals part of the MUHC
Glen superhospital 
Royal Victoria Hospital 
Montreal Children's Hospital 
Montreal Chest Institute 
Montreal General Hospital
Allan Memorial Institute (contains MGH's outpatient psychiatry)
Montreal Neurological Hospital
Hôpital de Lachine

Affiliated  hospitals
These hospitals are affiliated with the McGill Faculty of Medicine, but aren't integral parts of the MUHC.
Lakeshore General Hospital
Jewish General Hospital
St. Mary's Hospital
Douglas Mental Health University Institute
Shriners Hospital for Children

Public transit connections
Vendôme metro and train station connect here through an accessible modern entrance pavilion. The Société de transport de Montréal (STM) was criticised when the pedestrian tunnel to the hospital opened in 2015 as the station was not accessible. Work began in 2017 to make the station accessible, completing in 2021.

The station includes 5 elevators, an underground tunnel to the MUHC mega hospital, exo train station and métro station. It was inaugurated on May 31 2021. The 17, 37, 90, 102, 104, 105, 124, 371 and 420 buses all stop near or at the hospital. The Orange line from the metro and the Vaudreuil-Hudson, Candiac and Saint-Jérôme lines from the train station also stop here.

Controversies
The 2004–2011 tenure of Arthur Porter, a politically active Montreal physician, as the hospital's CEO attracted extensive media scrutiny which intensified when it was revealed that he had received $22.5 million in consulting fees from SNC-Lavalin. After receiving these payments, Porter awarded the firm with a $1.3 billion contract related to the construction of the hospital. These dealings were found to be in violation of the Quebec Health Act. Porter resigned on December 5, 2011.  Further investigation of the case by Quebec anti-corruption investigators resulted in allegations of the involvement of SNC-Lavalin and health centre employees in fraud and forgery. Porter left Canada, and was apprehended by Interpol agents with his wife in Panama, where he was imprisoned while awaiting his extradition to Quebec. He died from metastatic lung cancer in 2015 before he could be extradited.

See also
 Centre hospitalier de l'Université de Montréal, the other major hospital network in Montreal, affiliated to the Université de Montréal.

References

External links
 

McGill University
Hospital networks in Canada
Hospitals established in 1997
BSL3 laboratories in Canada